Frīdrihs Briedis (June 23, 1888 – August 28, 1918) was a Latvian colonel and one of the most famous Latvian Riflemen commanders. He was posthumously the recipient of  all classes of the Order of Lāčplēsis.

Early life
To escape dishonest and harsh baronial treatment, Briedis' father moved the family from Vidzeme to Vitebsk Governorate (today's Shumilina Raion in Belarus), where he obtained forest land, cleared it for growing corn, and built the house where Briedis was born, the youngest of three children.

Briedis' upbringing, particularly his mother's influence, engendered in him a devout nature. He graduated with distinction from the local rural district (pagasts) and local congregational church schools.

He left his family home in 1902, traveling to Daugavpils, where he moved in with relatives and entered the six-year city school. A consistently excellent student, he devoted his spare time furthering his religious studies, tutoring to buy books, hoping one day to become a minister—his goal to battle the moral decay which deeply affected him at the time of the Russo-Japanese War. By his own admission, he had time for few, if any, friends.

Finished with school, Briedis determined to enter the Monastery at Belye Berega. Having arrived at the rail station, nearly at his destination, he encountered two inebriated monks. A shocked Briedis renounced any thought of entering the priesthood—he held boozing to be the most vile immorality and would have no truck with any who engaged in it. To fill the void, in 1905, Briedis found a new calling—the military.

Military service

Russian Army units
In 1906 he was accepted into the St.Petersburg's Vladimir War School. Due to his excellent tactical knowledge he reached the rank of Senior sergeant by his last year at the school. Briedis graduated from the war school with the rank of Podporuchik, and afterwards he served in the 99th Ivangorod infantry regiment, which was deployed in Daugavpils. In 1912 he attained the rank of Poruchik and was appointed the company's Commander.

He participated in World War I, initially serving in East Prussia, where he successfully led reconnaissance patrols and received numerous awards for valor and his accomplishments.

Latvian Riflemen
When the formation of the Latvian Riflemen battalions begun in 1915 he was appointed to command the 1st Daugavgrīva battalion. He and his men participated in battles near the Misa River, and near Ķekava. In March 1916 Briedis was severely wounded in the jaw, but he recovered and participated in the Christmas Battles as commander of a battalion. During the Christmas Battles he fought in Tīreļpurvs, where he was wounded for a second time.

Briedis was in hospital when the February Revolution broke out, triggering the collapse of the army. Many riflemen joined the Red Army, but Briedis was among those who refused to do so.

In 1918 he joined an anti-bolshevist conspiracy in Moscow. On July 23, 1918, he was arrested by the Cheka, and on August 27, 1918, he was executed in Moscow by firing squad. He received all classes of the Order of Lāčplēsis for his valor in the Christmas Battles, and for participation in almost all the rifleman's operations on the Riga front. In Riga there is also a street named in his name.

References in popular culture 

Latvian pagan metal band Skyforger has a song Pulkvedis Briedis (Colonel Briedis) dedicated to Frīdrihs Briedis.
It is included in the Latvian rifleman album.

References 

1888 births
1918 deaths
People from Shumilina District
People from Polotsky Uyezd
Russian military personnel of World War I
Latvian Riflemen
Latvian military personnel
People of the Russian Civil War
Recipients of the Order of Lāčplēsis, 1st class
Recipients of the Order of Lāčplēsis, 2nd class
Recipients of the Order of Lāčplēsis, 3rd class
Recipients of the Cross of St. George
Recipients of the Order of St. Vladimir, 4th class
Recipients of the Order of St. Anna, 2nd class
Recipients of the Order of Saint Stanislaus (Russian), 2nd class
Latvian anti-communists
Victims of Red Terror in Soviet Russia
Executed Latvian people
Executed military personnel
People executed by Russia by firing squad
19th-century Latvian people
20th-century Latvian people